Jambelí Cove is the 620 m wide cove indenting for 140 m the north coast of Greenwich Island in the South Shetland Islands, Antarctica and entered between Spark Point and Orión Point.  The area was visited by 19th century sealers operating from nearby Clothier Harbour.

The feature is named after the Jambelí Archipelago in Ecuador.

Location

Maps
 L.L. Ivanov et al. Antarctica: Livingston Island and Greenwich Island, South Shetland Islands. Scale 1:100000 topographic map. Sofia: Antarctic Place-names Commission of Bulgaria, 2005.
 L.L. Ivanov. Antarctica: Livingston Island and Greenwich, Robert, Snow and Smith Islands. Scale 1:120000 topographic map.  Troyan: Manfred Wörner Foundation, 2009.

References
 SCAR Composite Antarctic Gazetteer.

Coves of Greenwich Island